Lycodon subcinctus, commonly known as the white-banded wolf snake or Malayan banded wolf snake, is a species of snake of the family Colubridae. This snake has banded pattern that resembles a  Krait.

Geographic range
The snake is found in Asia.

Subspecies
 Lycodon subcinctus maculatus (Cope, 1895)
 Lycodon subcinctus subcinctus Boie, 1827

References 

Reptiles described in 1827
Reptiles of Southeast Asia
subcinctus
Reptiles of Borneo